The disk-footed bat (Eudiscopus denticulus) is a species of vesper bat in the Vespertilionidae family found in Laos and Myanmar. The disc-footed bat was recorded in the northeastern Indian state's (Meghalaya), Lailad area near the Nongkhyllem Wildlife Sanctuary. It is about 1000 km west of the bats nearest known habitat, Myanmar.

Phylogenetic analysis supports it being a basal member of Myotinae, which also contains the well-known, cosmopolitan genus Myotis.

Sources

External links
 Photos of several bat species, including (Eudiscopus denticulus) and some other animals (Google translation from Thai)

Vesper bats
Taxa named by Wilfred Hudson Osgood
Mammals described in 1932
Bats of Southeast Asia
Taxonomy articles created by Polbot